A.J. Shannon (born June 8, 1980) is a Canadian retired lacrosse player, who played for the Philadelphia Wings, Edmonton Rush, and the Buffalo Bandits in the National Lacrosse League, and the Boston Cannons of the Major League Lacrosse.

College career
While attending the University of Virginia, Shannon led the Cavaliers to win the 2003 NCAA Division I Men's Lacrosse Championship.

Professional career
Shannon was drafted by the Buffalo Bandits in the first round (6th overall) in the 2003 NLL entry draft.  Following the 2004 NLL season, he was named to the NLL All-Rookie team.  He was acquired by the Edmonton Rush prior to the 2007 NLL season. In March of the 2008 NLL season, Shannon was traded to the Philadelphia Wings in a series a deals that involved four-teams and six players.

Shannon hit his stride in 2008, putting up his best point total since his rookie season. Shannon started with Edmonton, and finished in Philadelphia, scoring 40 points (22G, 18A), while collecting a career high 55 loose balls, helping Philadelphia to secure their first playoff berth since 2001.

Shannon's production would decline in 2009 with injuries, and eventually, finished his career in an injury-plagued 2010 season with Buffalo.

Canadian Box career
Shannon is a two-time winner of the Minto Cup, Canada's Junior A Lacrosse National Championship, as a member of the Whitby Warriors in 1997 and 1999.

Statistics

NLL

University of Virginia

References

1980 births
Buffalo Bandits players
Canadian lacrosse players
Edmonton Rush players
Lacrosse people from Ontario
Living people
Major League Lacrosse players
Sportspeople from Whitby, Ontario
Philadelphia Wings players
Virginia Cavaliers men's lacrosse players